Chlamydogobius squamigenus, the Edgbaston goby, is a critically endangered species of goby endemic to the Edgbaston Reserve in Central Queensland, Australia where it occurs in small pools with clay bottoms and emergent tussock grasses.  This species can reach a length of  SL. The red-finned blue-eye, 11 snail species, a small crustacean, a flatworm, a spider and a dragonfly are restricted to the same springs and also threatened.

References

Edgbaston goby
Freshwater fish of Queensland
Endemic fauna of Australia
Critically endangered fauna of Australia
Edgbaston goby
Taxa named by Helen K. Larson
Taxonomy articles created by Polbot